The 2021–22 Liga MX season  (known as the Liga BBVA MX for sponsorship reasons) was the 75th professional season of the top-flight football league in Mexico. The season was divided into two championships—the Apertura 2021 and the Clausura 2022—each in an identical format and each contested by the same eighteen teams. 

On 5 March 2022, during a match between Queretaro and Atlas, a riot broke out in the stands at Estadio Corregidora resulting in 26 injuries.

Stadiums and locations

Stadium Changes

Personnel and kits

Managerial changes

Torneo Apertura
The Grita México Apertura 2021 was the first tournament of the season. The tournament was renamed Torneo Grita México Apertura 2021 (stylized as Grita... México A21) with the intention of encouraging fans in the stands not to scream an offensive chant after a goal kick. The tournament began on 22 July. The defending champions were Cruz Azul.

Standings

Positions by Round

Results 
Teams played every other team once (either at home or away), completing a total of 17 rounds.

Regular Season statistics 
First goal of the season:  Juan Otero for Santos Laguna against Necaxa (23 July 2021)
Last goal of the season:  Diogo de Olivera for UNAM against Cruz Azul (7 November 2021)

Top goalscorers 
Players sorted first by goals scored, then by last name.

Source: Liga MX

Top assists 
Players sorted first by assists, then by last name.

Source: Soccerway

Hat-tricks 

Notes
(H) – Home team(A) – Away team

Attendance

Per team

Source: Liga MX

Highest and lowest

Source: Liga MX

Final phase – Apertura 2021

Reclassification

Bracket

Quarter-finals

Semi-finals

Finals

Torneo Clausura
The Grita México Clausura 2022 is second tournament of the season. Like the Apertura 2021, the tournament was renamed Torneo Grita México Clausura 2022 (stylized as Grita... México C22) with the intention of encouraging fans in the stands not to scream an offensive chant after a goal kick. Atlas are the defending champions.

Standings

Positions by Round

Results 
Teams played every other team once (either at home or away), completing a total of 17 rounds.

Regular Season statistics 
First goal of the season:  Nicolás Ibáñez for Pachuca against Atlético San Luis (6 January 2022)
Last goal of the season:  Jaine Barreiro for León against Toluca (1 May 2022)

Top goalscorers 
Players sorted first by goals scored, then by last name.

Source: Liga MX

Top assists 
Players sorted first by assists, then by last name.

Source: Soccerway

Hat-tricks 

Notes
(H) – Home team(A) – Away team

Attendance

Per team

Highest and lowest

Source: Liga MX

Riot

On 5 March 2022, during a Round 9 match between Queretaro and Atlas, a riot broke out in the stands at Estadio Corregidora resulting in 26 injuries. As a result, Liga MX President Mikel Arriola announced that all remaining league matches scheduled for that week were postponed. One Liga de Expansión MX match and five Liga MX Femenil matches scheduled for that week were also postponed.

Final phase – Clausura 2022

Reclassification

Bracket

Quarter-finals

Semi-finals

Finals

Annual awards

Coefficient table
As of the 2020–21 season, the promotion and relegation between Liga MX and Liga de Expansión MX (formerly known as Ascenso MX) was suspended, however, the coefficient table will be used to establish the payment of fines that will be used for the development of the clubs of the silver circuit. 

Per Article 24 of the competition regulations, the payment of $MXN160 million will be distributed among the last three positioned in the coefficient table as follows: 80 million in the last place; 47 million the penultimate; and 33 million will be paid by the sixteenth team in the table, as of the 2021–22 season the remaining  $MXN80 million will be paid through the financial remnants generated by the Liga MX itself. The team that finishes last on the table will start the following season with a coefficient of zero.  If the last ranked team, which was Atlético San Luis, repeats as the last ranked team in the 2021–22 season coefficient table, they will be fined an additional $MXN20 million.

 Rules for fine payment: 1) Fine coefficient; 2) Goal difference; 3) Number of goals scored; 4) Head-to-head results between tied teams; 5) Number of goals scored away; 6) Fair Play points
 F = Team will have to pay fine indicated
Source: Liga MX

Aggregate table 
The aggregate table (the sum of points of both the Apertura 2021 and Clausura 2022 tournaments) was being used to determine participants in the 2022 Leagues Cup. On 15 April 2022, it was announced the tournament was cancelled due to fixture congestion from the 2022 FIFA World Cup.

Number of teams by state

Notes

See also 
2021–22 Liga de Expansión MX season
2021–22 Liga MX Femenil season
2021 MLS All-Star Game

References

External links
 Official website of Liga MX

Liga MX
Liga MX seasons
Liga MX